In Defense of My Own Happiness (The Beginnings) (stylized in all lowercase and originally titled In Defense of My Own Happiness (Vol. 1)) is the second studio album by American singer-songwriter Joy Oladokun. The ten-track album was released on July 17, 2020 through White Boy Records and re-released by Amigo Records and Verve Forecast Records under its current title on March 30, 2021. It was promoted by eight singles. A sequel to the album, titled simply In Defense of My Own Happiness was released on June 4, 2021 and included "Sunday" and "Breathe Again" from volume one. A "complete edition" was released on July 9, 2021 collecting both volumes.

Critical reception
Susan Hansen, writing for The Line of Best Fit, gave the album a score of eight out of ten, saying "Showing the way into new genre-blending territory, Joy Oladokun’s fertile, present day mix of pop, R&B and folk constitutes irresistibility and pertinence." and compared her "guitar lines, vocals and contemplative lyrics" to Tracy Chapman.

Track listing

Notes
All song titles stylized in all lowercase.

Release history

References

Joy Oladokun albums
2020 albums
Hip hop albums by American artists
Verve Forecast Records albums